Ferenc Batthyány de Németújvár (28 October 1497 – 28 November 1566) was a Hungarian magnate and general, member of the prestigious Batthyány family. He served as Ban of Croatia, Dalmatia and Slavonia from 1522 to 1526 and, as a partisan of King Ferdinand I, from 1527 to 1531.

References

Sources 

1497 births
1566 deaths
Bans of Croatia
Bans of Slavonia
Ferenc
16th-century Hungarian nobility
Medieval Hungarian soldiers